The 1988 Copa Libertadores de América was the 29th edition of the Copa Libertadores, South America's premier international club football tournament organized by CONMEBOL. This season's defending champion Peñarol of Uruguay were defeated by San Lorenzo of Argentina. In the finals, Nacional defeated Newell's Old Boys.

Draw 
The champions and runners-up of each football association were drawn into the same group along with another football association's participating teams. Three clubs from Uruguay competed as Peñarol was champion of the 1987 Copa Libertadores. They entered the tournament in the third stage.

First stage

Group 1

Group 2

Tie-breaker 
Newell's Old Boys and San Lorenzo played an extra match to determine the winner of the group.

Group 3

Group 4

Group 5

Knockout phase

Bracket

Second stage 
The group winners and runners-up were drawn in the second stage of the competition. The away goals rule was applied to determine the winner between Nacional and Universidad Católica.

Third stage 
The defending champion Peñarol entered the competition in this round. The three winners and the best-ranked loser advanced to the semifinals.

Ranking of losing teams

Semifinals

Finals

External links 
 Sitio oficial de la CONMEBOL
 Libertadores 1988 at RSSSF.com

1
Copa Libertadores seasons